O͘ is one of the six Taiwanese Hokkien vowels as written in the Pe̍h-ōe-jī (POJ) orthography. It is pronounced . Because Taiwanese Hokkien is a tonal language, the standard letter without a diacritic represents the vowel in the first tone, and the other five possible tone categories require one of the following tonal symbols to be written above it:
Ó͘ ó͘ (second tone)
Ò͘ ò͘ (third tone)
Ô͘ ô͘ (fifth tone)
Ō͘ ō͘ (seventh tone)
O̍͘ o̍͘ (eighth tone)

History

Computing
This letter is not well-supported by fonts and is often typed as either o· (using the interpunct), o• (using the bullet), o' (using the apostrophe), oo, or ou.

References

Languages of Taiwan
Vowel letters
Latin letters with diacritics